Simona Gioli (born September 17, 1977, in Rapallo) is a retired volleyball player from Italy. Currently, she plays for Galatasaray in Turkey. Gioli was a member of the Women's National Team that won the gold medal at the 2007 European Championship in Belgium and Luxembourg. Gioli was named "Most Valuable Player and ""Best Blocker" at the 2007 FIVB Women's World Cup and 2009 FIVB Women's World Grand Champions Cup. She was also awarded "MVP" at the 2006-07 CEV Cup won by her team Sirio Perugia. She won the 2007–08 CEV Indesit Champions League with Sirio Perugia and also was individually awarded "Most Valuable Player".

Playing with Dynamo Moscow she won the silver medal at the 2008–09 CEV Indesit Champions League, and she was awarded "Best Spiker".

Clubs
  Sirio Perugia (2006–2008)
  Dynamo Moscow (2008–2011)
  Fakel Novy Urengoi (2011-2012)
  Galatasaray Daikin (2012-2013)
  IHF Volley (2013-2014)
  Metalleghe Sanitars Montichiari (2014–present)

Awards

Individuals
 2009 European Championships "Best Spiker"
 2009 World Grand Champion Cup "Most Valuable Player"
 2008–09 CEV Indesit Champions League Final Four "Best Spiker"
 2007–08 CEV Indesit Champions League Final Four "Most Valuable Player"
 2006-07 CEV Cup "Most Valuable Player"
 2007 FIVB World Cup "Most Valuable Player"
 2007 FIVB World Cup "Best Blocker"

Clubs
 2006-07 CEV Cup -  Champion, with Pallavolo Sirio Perugia
 2007–08 CEV Indesit Champions League -   Champion, with Colussi Perugia
 2008–09 CEV Indesit Champions League -  Runner-Up, with Dynamo Moscow
 2012 Turkish Volleyball Super Cup -  Runner-Up, with Galatasaray Daikin
 2012-2013 Turkish Women's Volleyball Cup -  Bronze Medal with Galatasaray Daikin

References

External links
 FIVB profile

1977 births
Living people
People from Rapallo
Italian women's volleyball players
Galatasaray S.K. (women's volleyball) players
Olympic volleyball players of Italy
Volleyball players at the 2008 Summer Olympics
Volleyball players at the 2012 Summer Olympics
Mediterranean Games medalists in volleyball
Mediterranean Games gold medalists for Italy
Competitors at the 2009 Mediterranean Games
Sportspeople from the Province of Genoa